Katuzar Murzard (also Romanized as Katūzār Mūrzard; also known as Katehzār) is a village in Margown Rural District, Margown District, Boyer-Ahmad County, Kohgiluyeh and Boyer-Ahmad Province, Iran. At the 2006 census, its population was 72, in 11 families.

References 

Populated places in Boyer-Ahmad County